Elliot Segal (born February 17, 1969) is an American talk radio host. His Elliot in the Morning show is broadcast on WWDC (FM) in Washington, D.C., WRXL in Richmond, Virginia, and KRBZ in Kansas City, Missouri.

Personal

Segal was born in Canada but grew up in Houston, Texas. He is married and has two sons. He was a member of Alpha Tau Omega fraternity while in college at Houston Baptist University for a trimester.

Career
Segal is a "shock jock", who is fond of toilet humor, gross-out jokes, and oddball stunts, which have comprised a large portion of material on his show, in addition to discussing current events, entertainment, politics, sports, and crime stories.
His trademark is a loud, maniacal laugh. He frequently uses catchphrases, each with its own colorful origins. 

Segal is also involved with many local charities including Olie & Elliot's Great Saves with former Washington Capitals goalie, Olaf Kölzig, and the National Center for Missing and Exploited Children. He has, in the past, featured weekly interviews with America's Most Wanted producer, Donna Brant, to highlight specific cases from around the country, and has three captures attributed to these segments (through October 2007).  He has also talked semi-regularly with John Walsh and has even appeared in a re-enactment on the show.  In addition to these things, once upon finding out that the video game unit had been stolen by a parent from the children's ward of the hospital he was in with his son in 2006, Segal arranged for several new & used video game systems to be donated to the hospital via local merchants and listeners of his radio show. 

Segal made a brief cameo in Nickelback's music video for the song Rockstar. He appears at 01:36 where he's put in a headlock by MMA fighter Chuck Liddell,  and then again at 02:15 where he's mouthing the words to the song's chorus while alone on a bench.

WOR (AM) canceled Segal's show on February 18, 2014, after just one month on the air.

Segal was inducted into the Radio Hall of Fame on October 28, 2021. Fellow inductees include Dan Patrick and Kim Komando.

Controversy

FCC fine for Bishop O'Connell High School incident
During the May 7, 2002 Elliot in the Morning show, two sixteen-year-old female students at Bishop Denis J. O'Connell High School called the show to be considered in a contest whose winners were to be cage dancers at an upcoming Kid Rock concert at George Mason University's Patriot Center. Goaded by Segal, they discussed alleged sexual activity at school. The students, who claimed to be eighteen, discussed giving oral sex to lines of boys in the hallway and having intercourse in stairwells and closets. They implied these acts occurred during a typical school day. The students, who had used false names on air, were suspended the same day for their comments. 

The principal addressed the student body on the PA system and discussed the immorality of Segal's radio show. Angered by the students' suspension, Segal personally insulted the principal on air the following day, making lewd remarks about his family and his sexual activity. He also mocked the school's mission statement, specifically what he considered to be a hypocritical statement that their educational environment is "rooted in the life of Christ." 

The two days of broadcasting were ruled indecent by the Federal Communications Commission (FCC). In October 2003, DC101's parent company Clear Channel Communications was fined $55,000 as a result.

References

1969 births
American talk radio hosts
American people of Canadian descent
Anglophone Quebec people
Houston Christian University alumni
Living people
People from Montreal
Shock jocks